Cherdyn is the name of several inhabited localities in Russia:

Urban localities
Cherdyn, Perm Krai, a town in Cherdynsky District of Perm Krai

Rural localities
Cherdyn, Krasnoyarsk Krai, a village in Nazarovsky District of Krasnoyarsk Krai